Andrew Hsia (born 24 December 1950) is a Taiwanese politician who is a vice chairman of the Kuomintang. He was minister of the Mainland Affairs Council from February 2015 to May 2016, and was Chairman of the Association of Foreign Relations (AFR) from 2017 to 2022.

Education
Hsia obtained his bachelor's degree in law from Fu-Jen Catholic University in 1972, master's degree in diplomacy from National Chengchi University in 1976, master's degree in international law from University of Oxford in the United Kingdom (UK) in 1980 and master's degree in law from University College London in the UK in 1981.

Career

ROC Representative to the United States 
In mid of August 2005, Hsia protested to the United Nations (UN) for naming the People's Republic of China (PRC) as one of the founding member of the UN that signed the United Nations Charter during an exhibition commemorating 60th anniversary of the UN, instead of the Republic of China (ROC). He stressed that in 1945, it was the ROC who were the China, since PRC was only founded in 1949.

ROC Representative to India 
After being appointed ROC representative to India in June 2007, Hsia said that he hoped to work on securing India's support for Taiwan's membership in the World Health Organization of the United Nations. He also would focus on trade, tourism and technological exchanges between the two.

ROC Foreign Affairs Deputy Ministry 
Hsia resigned from his post in August 2009 after a cable was disclosed by a newspaper stating that the Ministry of Foreign Affairs had instructed all of the ROC representative offices around the world to decline all forms of foreign aid in the aftermath of Typhoon Morakot.

ROC Representative to Indonesia 
During his term as the ROC representative to Indonesia, Hsia actively promoted bilateral exchanges between Taiwan and Indonesia in the field of trade, culture and education. He was involved in the joint development of Morotai Island of North Maluku province and an industrial park in Jakarta.

2013 Jakarta International Defense Dialogue 
Commenting on the barring of the Taiwanese delegation to attend the 3rd Jakarta International Defense Dialogue (JIDD) in Jakarta in March 2013, Hsia said that he was not pleased with the incident since this conference is about regional security and Taiwan is certainly one of the major player. The Taipei Economic and Trade Office in Jakarta demanded an explanation from the Government of Indonesia regarding the incident.

Indonesia, represented by the JIDD organizing committee chairperson, responded by saying that the Ministry of Defense of Indonesia had received a verbal complaint from the Chinese Embassy asking them to discourage the Taiwanese delegates from attending the conference.

ROC National Defense Deputy Ministry 
On 22 October 2013, Premier Jiang Yi-huah named Hsia to fill in the position of Deputy Minister of the National Defense, in which Hsia will be tasked to oversee arms procurement policies.

The position had been vacated for more than 2 months since 1 August 2013 when then-Deputy Minister of National Defense Andrew Yang was promoted to the Minister position after the resignation of then-Minister of National Defense Kao Hua-chu due to the death scandal of army corporal Hung Chung-chiu.

Jiang said that the decision to choose him for this position was made after consultation with President Ma Ying-jeou, Ministry of Foreign Affairs and Ministry of National Defense.

Vice Chairman of the Kuomintang 
During a visit to the People's Republic of China in February, he met with Song Tao, director of the Taiwan Affairs Office, and Wang Huning, fourth-ranking member of the Politburo Standing Committee of the Chinese Communist Party. During the visit, Wang said that "Taiwan independence is incompatible with peace and runs counter to the well-being of Taiwan compatriots".

References

1950 births
Living people
Taiwanese Ministers of Foreign Affairs
Taiwanese Ministers of National Defense
Representatives of Taiwan to Indonesia
Representatives of Taiwan to India
Fu Jen Catholic University alumni